Suzanne Crémieux (29 June 1895 – 11 July 1976) was a French politician. She served as a member of the French Senate from 1948 to 1955, representing Gard.

References

1895 births
1976 deaths
Politicians from Paris
People from Gard
20th-century French journalists
French women journalists
French Senators of the Fourth Republic
Women members of the Senate (France)
Senators of Gard
20th-century French women